Nobody's Fool is a 1994 American comedy-drama film based on the 1993 novel of the same name by Richard Russo.  The film was written for the screen and directed by Robert Benton and stars Paul Newman, Jessica Tandy, Bruce Willis, Melanie Griffith, Dylan Walsh, Pruitt Taylor Vince, Gene Saks, Josef Sommer, Philip Seymour Hoffman, and Philip Bosco.  It was Paramount's final production under its Paramount Communications ownership (being sold to the original Viacom in July 1994) as well as Tandy's final film performance before her death on September 11, 1994.

Plot
Donald "Sully" Sullivan is a stubborn old reprobate living in the peaceful, snowy northern New York state village of North Bath. He freelances in the construction business, usually with his dim-witted friend Rub by his side. He is often at odds with Carl Roebuck, a local contractor, suing him at every opportunity for unpaid wages and disability. Sully's one-legged lawyer Wirf is inept, and his lawsuits are repeatedly dismissed. As a way to irritate him, Sully openly flirts with Carl's wife Toby at every opportunity (which she enjoys). He is a regular at the Iron Horse Saloon, where he often has drinks and plays cards with Wirf, Carl, Rub, Jocko the town pharmacist, and Ollie Quinn, the town's Chief of Police.

A running joke is the repeated theft of Carl's snowblower. Sully steals it to get back at Carl for his latest failed lawsuit. Carl steals it back, placing it in the yard at his construction business guarded by his doberman pinscher guard dog. Sully, after drugging the dog, steals it a second time. Carl takes it back a final time, and leaves the dog, who is now skittish due to his drugging, at Sully's childhood home for him to find.

Sully is a tenant in the home of the elderly Miss Beryl, his 8th grade teacher, whose banker son Clive strongly urges her to kick him out and sell the house. Family complications of his own develop for Sully with a visit from Peter, his estranged son who is a jobless professor at odds with his wife. While he and Sully reconstruct their relationship, Sully begins a new one with young grandson Will. Peter's sudden everyday presence does not sit well with Rub, but Sully tells him that although Peter is his son, Rub is still his best friend. Meanwhile, Clive is on the verge of a lucrative deal to build an amusement park in North Bath. However, the deal unexpectedly falls through when the promoter turns out to be a con man, and Clive quietly skips town in shame since he used his bank's resources to help finance the amusement park.

After being jailed for punching a police officer named Raymer who has been persecuting him, Sully's luck seems to be all bad. But his son and grandson start to warm up to him, and his fortune takes a turn for the better when his horse racing trifecta ticket wins. Even the lovely Toby expresses a willingness to leave Carl, mostly due to his constant womanizing, and run away with Sully to Hawaii. Sully realizes he can't leave his grandson and thanks Toby for considering him, just before she leaves for the airport. In the end, Sully is pretty much back where he began, boarding at Miss Beryl's. But now he is a little richer, both financially and in his soul, he's a new dog owner, and he has become the picture of contentment.

Cast

Production
The setting for both the book and movie, the fictional North Bath, New York, is based on the city of Ballston Spa, New York, in Saratoga County, New York, just east of Gloversville, where Russo grew up. The real Ballston Spa was overshadowed by neighboring Saratoga Springs, just as North Bath was eclipsed by the fictional Schuyler Springs.  
Nobody's Fool was filmed in the Hudson Valley City of Beacon, which was paid a $40,000 location fee for services and inconveniences.  Production began in November 1993 and concluded in February 1994. The Iron Horse Bar, located on N. 7th Street in Hudson, NY is now the Governor's Tavern; and the Diner is now The Grazin' Diner on North Warren Street, just around the corner in Hudson.

Bruce Willis reportedly agreed to a substantial pay cut to appear in the film, accepting the SAG-AFTRA scale of $1,400 per week at a time when the actor was earning roughly $15 million for his action movies.

Reception

Box office
Nobody's Fool was given a limited release on December 23, 1994, earning $92,838 in six theaters.  The film was given a wide release on January 13, 1995, earning $7,142,691 over its opening weekend in 792 theaters.  The film ultimately grossed $39,491,975 in North America.

Critical response
Nobody's Fool was well received by film critics.  The film maintains a "Certified Fresh" 91% rating on the review aggregator Rotten Tomatoes based on reviews from 55 critics. The site's consensus states: "It's solidly directed by Robert Benton and stacked with fine performances from an impressive cast, but above all, Nobody's Fool is a showcase for some of Paul Newman's best late-period work." On Metacritic the film has a score of 86 out of 100 based on reviews from 28 critics, indicating "universal acclaim".

Todd McCarthy of Variety wrote:   Desson Howe of The Washington Post similarly remarked:   Jonathan Rosenbaum of The Chicago Reader also wrote: 

Paul Newman was particularly lauded by critics.  Caryn James of The New York Times described the star's performance as "the single best of this year and among the finest he has ever given".

Roger Ebert of the Chicago Sun-Times wrote:

Accolades

Year-end lists
 3rd – John Hurley, Staten Island Advance
 5th – Michael MacCambridge, Austin American-Statesman
 7th – National Board of Review
 10th – Janet Maslin, The New York Times
 Top 10 (listed alphabetically, not ranked) – Jimmy Fowler, Dallas Observer
 Top 10 (listed alphabetically, not ranked) – Bob Ross, The Tampa Tribune
 "The second 10" (not ranked) – Sean P. Means, The Salt Lake Tribune
 Honorable mention –  Glenn Lovell, San Jose Mercury News
 Honorable mention – Jeff Simon, The Buffalo News

References

External links

 

1994 films
1990s English-language films
1994 comedy-drama films
American comedy-drama films
Beacon, New York
Films based on American novels
Films directed by Robert Benton
Films set in New York (state)
Films shot in New York (state)
Paramount Pictures films
Films scored by Howard Shore
Films produced by Scott Rudin
Films with screenplays by Robert Benton
1990s American films
English-language comedy-drama films